In-vessel composting generally describes a group of methods that confine the composting materials within a building, container, or vessel.  In-vessel composting systems can consist of metal or plastic tanks or concrete bunkers in which air flow and temperature can be controlled, using the principles of a "bioreactor". Generally the air circulation is metered in via buried tubes that allow fresh air to be injected under pressure, with the exhaust being extracted through a biofilter, with temperature and moisture conditions monitored using probes in the mass to allow maintenance of optimum aerobic decomposition conditions.

This technique is generally used for municipal scale organic waste processing, including final treatment of sewage biosolids, to a stable state with safe pathogen levels, for reclamation as a soil amendment. In-vessel composting can also refer to aerated static pile composting with the addition of removable covers that enclose the piles, as with the system in extensive use by farmer groups in Thailand, supported by the National Science and Technology Development Agency there. In recent years, smaller scale in-vessel composting has been advanced.  These can even use common roll-off waste dumpsters as the vessel.  The advantage of using roll-off waste dumpsters is their relatively low cost, wide availability, they are highly mobile, often do not need building permits and can be obtained by renting or buying.

Evaluation is ongoing with regard to the health risks associated with compost derived from sewage biosolids—including identifying safe levels of contaminates such as PFASs ("forever chemicals").
 
Offensive odors are caused by putrefaction (anaerobic decomposition) of nitrogenous animal and vegetable matter gassing off as ammonia. This is controlled with a higher carbon to nitrogen ratio, or increased aeration by ventilation, and use of a coarser grade of carbon material to allow better air circulation. Prevention and capture of any gases naturally occurring (volatile organic compounds) during the hot aerobic composting involved is the objective of the biofilter, and as the filtering material saturates over time, it can be used in the composting process and replaced with fresh material.

A more advanced systems design is able to limit the odor issues considerably, and it is also able to raise the total energy and resource output by integrating in-vessel composting with anaerobic digestion. Through anaerobic decomposition it is also possible to reduce pathogen levels similarly to that of traditional aerated composting when the anaerobic bioreactors operate at thermophilic temperatures, between 41 and 122 °C (106 and 252 °F).§

Gallery

See also 
Aerated static pile composting
Anaerobic digestion
Compost
List of solid waste treatment technologies
Mechanical biological treatment
Waste management
Windrow composting

References

Industrial composting
Waste treatment technology